Afia Pokua (known as Vim Lady) is a Ghanaian media personality and the Head of Programs at the Despite Media Group, operating Peace FM, Okay FM, Neat FM and Hello FM in Kumasi.

Education
Afia attended Labone Senior High School for her secondary education. She then proceeded to the Ghana Institute of Journalism and the Ghana Institute of Management And Public Administration for a bachelor's degree in law.

Career
She is the former editor of Adom FM, a subsidiary of Multimedia Group Limited. Seven 7 years ago, Afia had attempted to quit Mulitimedia following a misunderstanding she had with the management.

In October 2019, she resigned from the Multimedia Group and joined UTV, a satellite television station owned by the Despite Media Group Currently, Afia Pokuaa is the host of Egyaso Gyaso, a popular news analysis program aired on Okay FM Mondays and Fridays between 7pm and 9:30pm. She also co-hosts UTV's morning show dubbed Adekye Nsroma.

Awards and recognition 
Radio and Television Personalities Awards Radio Female Presenter of the Year 2019–2020.

Personal life 
In May 2020, Afia Pokua revealed for the first time that she has a son, who is in his teens.

Voluntary work
In 2018, she founded the SugarDem Ministry, a gender parity activist group set up to parallel the PepperDem Ministry that advocates for women to uphold stricter relationships with men.

References

Ghanaian journalists
Year of birth missing (living people)
Living people
Ghanaian women journalists